Let's Do It Again is the second studio album by American soul singer-songwriter Leela James, released in the United States on March 24, 2009 by Shanachie Records. The album is a collection of cover versions of '60s, '70s, and '80s R&B songs (with the exception of The Rolling Stones' "Miss You" and Foreigner's "I Want to Know What Love Is"), and its title is a reference to the 1975 soundtrack album of the same name, whose title track, performed by The Staple Singers, is also covered on this album.

Critical reception

Allmusic editor Andy Kellman found that "on one hand, it is frustrating that James' second album, after all this time, contains no original songs; on the other, it should be a loose, no-fuss affair, less measured than A Change Is Gonna Come and more like James' well-regarded live show. The latter, thankfully, is very much true. James' selections are mostly inspired, containing some natural (if obvious) material [...] Overall, Let's Do It Again is one of Shanachie's best all-covers discs. May James find a support system that allows her to record albums of new material every other year (or so) from here on out."

Track listing
Credits adapted from the liner notes of Let's Do It Again.

Personnel

Musicians
Leela James – vocals, backing vocals
Teodross Avery – saxophone
Roland Barber – trombone
Kenyatta Beasley – trumpet
Rudy Bird – percussion
Melonie Daniels – backing vocals
Ralph "Buttaz" Kearns – keyboards, vocals
Andrea Martin – backing vocals
Ricardo Ramos – guitar
Steve "Supe" White – drums

Production
Leela James – producer, executive producer, vocal producer
Dave Darlington – mixing
Eric Elterman – engineer
Randall Grass – executive producer
Ralph "Buttaz" Kearns – associate producer
Kevin "K.T." Terrell – photography
Paul Wickliffe – mastering
Suzette Williams – executive producer

Charts

References

External links

2009 albums
Covers albums
Leela James albums
Shanachie Records albums
Blues albums by American artists
Funk albums by American artists